Monardella linoides is a species of flowering plant in the mint family known by the common name flaxleaf monardella.

It is native to southern California and slightly into adjacent sections of Nevada, Arizona, and Baja California.

It grows in many types of habitat from the Mojave Desert, through chaparral and woodlands in the Peninsular Ranges and Transverse Ranges, to subalpine forests in the Southern and Eastern Sierra Nevada.

Description
Monardella linoides is a gray-green perennial herb producing a slender erect stem up to about 50 centimeters in maximum height. The linear to oval leaves are 1 to 4 centimeters long and coated in grayish hairs. The inflorescence is a head of several flowers blooming in a cup of pale whitish or pink-tinged papery bracts 2 or 3 centimeters wide. The flowers are just over a centimeter long and light purple in color.

Subspecies
Subspecies include:
 Monardella linoides ssp. anemonoides — endemic to the Southern Sierra Nevada.
 Monardella linoides ssp. erecta — endemic to the San Gabriel Mountains and San Bernardino Mountains.
 Monardella linoides ssp. linoides
 Monardella linoides ssp. oblonga — endemic to the San Emigdio Mountains and Southern Sierra.
 Monardella linoides ssp. sierrae — Narrow leaved monardella, endemic to the Sierra Nevada.
 Monardella linoides ssp. stricta — endemic to the San Gabriel Mountains and San Bernardino Mountains.

 Monardella linoides ssp. viminea — reclassified as Monardella viminea, a federally listed endangered species.

References

External links
 Calflora Database: Monardella linoides (Flax like monardella)
 Jepson Manual eFlora (TJM2) treatment of Monardella linoides
 USDA Plants Profile for Monardella linoides
 The Nature Conservancy
 Monardella linoides − UC Photos gallery

linoides
Flora of California
Flora of Baja California
Flora of Arizona
Flora of Nevada
Flora of the California desert regions
Flora of the Sierra Nevada (United States)
Natural history of the California chaparral and woodlands
Natural history of the Mojave Desert
Natural history of the Peninsular Ranges
Natural history of the Transverse Ranges
Taxa named by Asa Gray